The swimming competition at the 1995 Summer Universiade took place in Fukuoka, Japan from August 24 to August 28, 1995.

Men's events

Women's events

References
 Results on HickokSports

Swimming at the 1995 Summer Universiade
Universiade
1995 Summer Universiade